"Amor de Engaño" (Love Cheats) is a pop ballad performed by Argentine band Erreway. It was written and produced by eminent producer, director and composer Cris Morena for the band's debut album Señales. The song features Felipe Colombo as its lead vocalist, and Camila Bordonaba, Benjamín Rojas and Luisana Lopilato as back vocalists. "Amor de Engaño" was often used in television series Rebelde Way season one, during the romantic scenes — mostly between Manuel Aguirre (Felipe Colombo) and Mía Colucci (Luisana Lopilato).

Other appearances 
"Amor de Engaño" enjoyed a radio success throughout Latin America, Europe and Israel. It was featured in television series Rebelde Way for several times. The song also appeared on every compilation album released by Erreway — Erreway en Concierto (2006), El Disco de Rebelde Way (2006) and Erreway presenta su caja recopilatoria (2007).

Music video 
The music video for "Amor de Engaño" was directed by Rebelde Way and Erreway creator Cris Morena. It features the band members Felipe Colombo and Luisana Lopilato as its protagonists. Lopilato plays a famous stage performer, while Colombo is her assistant to whom she does not pay attention.

References

External links 
 Official Video at the YouTube
 Erreway at the Last.fm

2002 singles
Erreway songs
Songs written by Cris Morena
2002 songs